Tarryn is a given name. Notable people with the name include:

Tarryn Aiken (born 1999), Australian rugby league footballer
Tarryn Allarakhia (born 1997), English footballer
Tarryn Bright (born 1983), South African field Olympic hockey player
Tarryn Davey (born 1996), New Zealand field hockey player
Tarryn Fisher (born 1983), South African-born novelist based in United States
Tarryn Glasby (born 1995), South African field hockey player
Tarryn Onafaro, Australian television presenter
Tarryn Thomas (born 2000), professional Australian rules footballer

See also
Taryn